USPRO National Championships is the name given by USA Cycling, the United States national governing body of cycling, for a series of national championships.

United States National Road Race Championships
United States National Criterium Championships
United States National Time Trial Championships

National cycling championships